Ivita Burmistre is a Latvian economist and diplomat who currently serves as Latvia Ambassador Extraordinary and Plenipotentiary to the United Kingdom. She previously served as Latvia’s first Ambassador to the Organisation for Economic Cooperation and Development (OECD) and to the United Nations Education, Scientific and Cultural Organization (UNESCO).

Activism and career 
Burmistre, during her high school days, participated in the ‘Baltic Way’, a mass demonstration, where two million people from Estonia, Latvia, and Lithuania joined hands to create a 600 km human chain to demand the return of freedom and democracy. Her diplomatic career began in the early 2000s, she then moved to serve in Washington D.C. as an economics and trade expert and later became Deputy Permanent Representative to the World Trade Organisation in Geneva, Switzerland. She was the Latvian Ambassador to the OECD and UNESCO in France from 2016 to 2020, after which she was redeployed to the United Kingdom.

References 

Living people
Year of birth missing (living people)
UNESCO officials
Latvian economists